Andy Kim is a self-titled album released by Andy Kim on Capitol Records.

The single "Rock Me Gently" hit #1 on the Billboard Hot 100, #2 in the UK, and #40 on the U.S. adult contemporary chart in 1974.  The song also reached #1 in Canada and #33 in West Germany.  The single "Fire, Baby I'm on Fire" hit #28 on the Billboard Hot 100.  The album landed on the Billboard 200 chart, reaching #21.

Track listing 
All songs written by Andy Kim.
 "Rock Me Gently"
 "Good Good Mornin'"	
 "Hang Up Those Rock 'N Roll Shoes"
 "Song I Can Sing Ya"
 "And I Will Sing You to Sleep"
 "Fire Baby, I'm On Fire"
 "Here Comes The Mornin'"
 "You Are My Everything"
 "Sunshine"
 "Rock Me Gently - Part II"

Chart positions
Album

Singles

References

1974 albums
Capitol Records albums